Flemish immigration to Wallonia was an important phenomenon in the History of Belgium. Kas Deprez wrote: Flanders was poor and backward in the 19th century. It hardly took part in the first industrial revolution. Flemings migrated to Wallonia (amongst other areas), to escape from the poverty at home.

Yves Quairiaux published the figures of the census from 1866 to 1910 which allow to understand the importance of this phenomenon.

Figures of the Flemish immigration 

These figures correspond to the figures of the book (translated  in French) of a Flemish journalist . Both authors agree that this phenomenon was very important in the nation building or in any case of the identity building of the two greatest Belgian population, the Walloons and the Flemings. Among the industrial areas along the Sillon industriel, the Borinage (in the West of Wallonia) and the region of Verviers (in the East) are less concerned by the phenomenon. The most important area of the Flemish immigration are three basins of the industrial Wallonia: Charleroi, Liège and the Centre  around La Louvière. In the period of the census published by Quairiaux, almost 500,000  Flemings came in Wallonia to find a job in the industry.

The Belgian census calculate the number of Belgians who speak French, Flemish (now Dutch), and German. Quairiaux estimates the number of the Flemings in Wallonia on the basis that in Wallonia in this period only the Flemings were Flemish-speaking or bilingual (Flemish-French).  They quickly adopted the regional culture and  the regional language (more Walloon or Picard than French in any case in the beginning).

Reception of the Flemings by the Walloons 

Walloon literature (as a regional language), did have its golden age during the peak of the Flemish immigration:  That period saw an efflorescence of Walloon literature, plays and poems primarily, and the founding of many theaters and periodicals. And that is mainly in the plays  that the Flemish people has been shown. Quairiaux learned more than  200 plays where he tried to describe the image of the Flemish people for Walloons. In this period plays were almost the only popular show in Wallonia.

Notes 

Wallonia
Social history of Belgium
History of Wallonia
Flanders
History of Flanders